Montignez is a municipality in the district of Porrentruy in the canton of Jura in Switzerland.  

On 1 January 2009 the former municipalities of Buix, Courtemaîche and Montignez merged to form the new municipality of Basse-Allaine.

References

Municipalities of the canton of Jura
Populated places disestablished in 2009
2009 disestablishments in Finland